The Battle of Montevideo may refer to:

Battles
Battle of Montevideo (1807), between the British and Spanish Empires during the Napoleonic Wars
Battle of Montevideo (1817), or Battle of River Ibicuí, between Luso-Brazilian forces and Uruguayan rebels
Battle of Montevideo (1823), between Brazilian and Portuguese naval forces during the Brazilian War of Independence
Battle of Montevideo (1843), in the Uruguayan Civil War

Sports
1967 Intercontinental Cup#Play-off, a football match, Celtic vs Racing Club, in Montevideo

See also

Uruguay
Montevideo
Uruguayan Civil War